Georgios Sournakis (born 7 November 1999) is a Greek professional footballer who plays as an midfielder.

References

1999 births
Living people
Super League Greece players
OFI Crete F.C. players
Association football midfielders
Footballers from Heraklion
Greek footballers